Hubert Max Lanier (August 18, 1915 – January 30, 2007) was an American left-handed pitcher in Major League Baseball who spent most of his career with the St. Louis Cardinals. He led the National League in earned run average in 1943, and was the winning pitcher of the clinching game in the 1944 World Series against the crosstown St. Louis Browns. His son Hal became a major league infielder and manager.

Career

Born in Denton, North Carolina, Lanier was one of a handful of players who remained active during the World War II years. A naturally right-handed player, he had become a left-handed pitcher only because he twice broke his right arm in childhood. After signing with the Cardinals in 1937, he reached the major leagues in 1938. He had arguably his best season in 1943, compiling a 15–7 record with a league-best 1.90 ERA. In 1944 he won a career-high 17 games, and was the winner of the final game of the World Series against the crosstown Browns. He was named an NL All-Star in both 1943 and 1944.

Lanier, along with a dozen other major leaguers, defected to the Mexican League in 1946 after being offered a salary nearly double what he was making with the Cardinals. Disappointed by poor playing conditions and allegedly broken contract promises, he tried to return to the Cardinals in 1948, but was barred by an order from commissioner Happy Chandler, imposing a five-year suspension on all players who had jumped to the Mexican League. In response, Lanier and teammate Fred Martin, as well as Danny Gardella of the New York Giants, sued Major League Baseball in federal court, challenging baseball's reserve clause as a violation of U.S. antitrust law (preceding the similar suit by Curt Flood some 25 years later). Chandler reinstated Lanier and the other players in June 1949. Lanier immediately held out for more money than he was being paid at the time of his leaving for Mexico, but eventually signed a contract paying him the same amount as in 1946.

Lanier rejoined the Cardinals in 1949. After winning a total of 101 games for the club, he ended his career with the New York Giants (1952–53) and the Browns (1953).

Over fourteen seasons, Lanier posted a 108–82 record with 821 strikeouts and a 3.01 ERA in 1619 innings pitched, including 21 shutouts and 91 complete games. Lanier's son Hal, would play in professional baseball for ten years.

Lanier died at age 91 in Dunnellon, Florida.

See also
 List of second-generation Major League Baseball players
 List of Major League Baseball annual ERA leaders

References

Further reading
 Honig, Donald (1975) Baseball When the Grass Was Real: Baseball from the Twenties to the Forties Told by the Men Who Played It. New York: Coward, McGann & Geoghegan. pp. 208–222. .

External links

Max Lanier - Baseballbiography.com

1915 births
2007 deaths
Baseball players from North Carolina
Beaumont Exporters players
Columbus Red Birds players
Drummondville Cubs players
Greensboro Patriots players
Kansas City Royals scouts
Major League Baseball pitchers
Minor league baseball managers
National League All-Stars
National League ERA champions
New York Giants (NL) players
People from Denton, North Carolina
People from Dunnellon, Florida
St. Louis Cardinals players
St. Louis Browns players
San Francisco Giants scouts
Shreveport Sports players
Baseball players from St. Petersburg, Florida
Belmont Chiefs players